"Pray to God" is a song by Scottish DJ and record producer Calvin Harris, featuring vocals from American rock band Haim. It was released on 6 March 2015 as the sixth and final single from Harris's fourth studio album, Motion (2014). The song attained moderate commercial success, reaching the top 10 in Australia, whilst claiming a top-40 position in the United Kingdom—his second single to miss the top 10 since 2010. The song is co-produced and co-written by Haim's regular producer Ariel Rechtshaid.

Composition
"Pray to God" is a house song. According to the sheet music published at MusicNotes.com, it is written in the key of G minor. It has a tempo of 126 bpm. Daniel Kreps of Rolling Stone said the song recalled Fleetwood Mac-esque harmonies.

Music video
The music video for "Pray to God" was directed by Emil Nava and premiered on 10 February 2015.

The video features Haim wearing all-black clothes in a variety of natural settings, including snow-capped mountains and the woods, surrounded by animals such as wolves, rabbits, bears, eagles, and lions, and riding horses.

Track listings

Credits and personnel
Credits adapted from the liner notes of Motion.

Recording
 Recorded at Fly Eye Studio (London) and Henson Studios (Los Angeles)
 Mixed at Larrabee Studios
 Mastered at The Exchange Mastering Studios (London)

Personnel
 Calvin Harris – instruments, production
 Haim – vocals
 Danielle Haim – guitars
 Ariel Rechtshaid – keyboards, additional production
 Manny Marroquin – mixing
 Chris Galland – mixing assistance
 Ike Schultz – mixing assistance
 Mike Marsh – mastering

Charts

Weekly charts

Year-end charts

Certifications

Release history

References

2014 songs
2015 singles
Calvin Harris songs
Columbia Records singles
Haim (band) songs
Song recordings produced by Ariel Rechtshaid
Songs written by Ariel Rechtshaid
Songs written by Calvin Harris
Songs written by Danielle Haim
Songs written by Este Haim
Songs written by Alana Haim